USS Pope (DE-134) was an Edsall-class destroyer escort built for the United States Navy during World War II. She served in the Atlantic Ocean and provided destroyer escort protection against submarine and air attack for Navy vessels and convoys.

She was named after commodore John Pope, born 17 December 1798 in Sandwich, Massachusetts. This ship also commemorated the destroyer  that had been sunk in the Battle of the Java Sea in 1942. She was laid down by Consolidated Steel Co., Orange, Texas, 14 July 1942; launched 12 January 1943; sponsored by Mrs. Rae W. Fabens, and commissioned 25 June 1943.

World War II North Atlantic operations
 
After a shakedown cruise off Bermuda, USS Pope escorted her first convoy eastwards to Casablanca, arriving on 23 September 1943. Subsequently, she escorted two more convoys into the Mediterranean Sea. She then began work with Task Group TG 22.3, an antisubmarine task group centered on the aircraft carrier . For her part in that action, USS Pope received the US Presidential Unit Citation. Pope continued operations with USS Guadalcanal in the Atlantic Ocean and the Caribbean Sea until the end of the war in the Atlantic and Europe. She assisted in the sinking of the U-boat U-546 on 24 April 1945.

Notable crew members were science writer Martin Gardner and pharmacologist Alexander Shulgin. An experience following an infection on board led to Shulgin's interest in the interface between the mind and molecular matter, and his decision to work in psychopharmacology.

End-of-war and post-war operations 
 

Post-war decommissioning 

USS Pope was decommissioned on 17 May 1946 at Green Cove Springs, Florida, and then she entered the Atlantic Reserve Fleet where she remained into 1970, when she was scrapped.

Awards 

Pope received three battle stars for World War II service in addition to the Presidential Unit Citation.

References

External links
 Dictionary of American Naval Fighting Ships
 NavSource Online: Destroyer Escort Photo Archive – USS POPE DE-134
 

Edsall-class destroyer escorts
Ships built in Orange, Texas
1943 ships
World War II frigates and destroyer escorts of the United States